Wishful thinking is the formation of beliefs according to what might be pleasing to imagine instead of by appealing to rationality.

Wishful Thinking may also refer to:

Music

Performers
 Wishful Thinking (Australian band), a pop punk band
 Wishful Thinking (British band), a rock band

Albums
 Wishful Thinking (Earl Klugh album), 1984
 Wishful Thinking (Neck Deep album), 2014
 Wishful Thinking (Propaganda album), 1985
 Wishful Thinking, by Ed O.G., 2002

Songs
 "Wishful Thinking" (China Crisis song), 1983
 "Wishful Thinking" (Duncan Sheik song), 1998
 "Wishful Thinking" (Wynn Stewart song), 1959
 "Wishful Thinking", by 4hero from Two Pages
 "Wishful Thinking", by Alphaville from Salvation (Alphaville album)
 "Wishful Thinking", by Dan Hill
 "Wishful Thinking", by the Ditty Bops from The Ditty Bops
 "Wishful Thinking", by John Petrucci from Suspended Animation
 "Wishful Thinkin, by Poison from Hollyweird
 "Wishful Thinkin, by Sly & the Family Stone from Small Talk
 "Wishful Thinkin, by Tony Booth (a.k.a. Johnny Booth)
 "Wishful Thinking", by Travis Tritt from Ten Feet Tall and Bulletproof
 "Wishful Thinking", by Wilco from A Ghost Is Born

Other media 
 Wishful Thinking (film), a 1997 American romantic comedy
 Wishful Thinking: a theological ABC, a 1973 non-fiction book by Frederick Buechner
 "Wishful Thinking" (Captain N: The Game Master), a television episode
 "Wishful Thinking" (Supernatural), a television episode

See also 
 Wishful Drinking, a 2008 autobiographical book by Carrie Fisher
Wishful Thinking About Winter, a composition by Wayne Slawson